Mohammed Abdulhakim Ahmed Al-Sarori commonly known as  Mohammed Al-Sarori (born 6 August 1994) is a Yemeni footballer who plays for Yemen national team.

International career

International goals
Scores and results list Yemen's goal tally first.

References

External links

1994 births
Living people
Yemeni footballers
Yemen international footballers
Yemeni expatriate footballers
Yemeni expatriate sportspeople in Qatar
Expatriate footballers in Qatar
Al-Ahli Club Sana'a players
Al-Wakrah SC players
Yemeni League players
Qatari Second Division players
Association football defenders